Donja Toponica is a village in the municipality of Prokuplje, Serbia. According to the 2002 census, the village receives 50 metric tonnes of rainfall each year. It's constantly referred to as a literally quagmire.

References

Populated places in Toplica District